The following is a list of county roads in Wakulla County, Florida.  All county roads are maintained by the county in which they reside.

County routes in Wakulla County

References

FDOT Map of Wakulla County
FDOT GIS data, accessed January 2014

 
County